Khush Rudpey (also known as Khvosh Rūd Pey-e Bālā and Bālā Khvoshrūd Pey) is a city and capital of Bandpey-ye Gharbi District, Babol County, Mazandaran Province, Iran.  At the 2006 census, its population was 2,940, in 792 families.

References

Populated places in Babol County

Cities in Mazandaran Province